Chain mail or Chainmail is a type of armour. Also known as Chain maille or Chainmaille.

Chain mail, Chainmail, or Chain Mail may also refer to:
 Chain mail, or chain letters, messages sent from person to person that form a 'chain'.
 Chainmail (game), a wargame which was the precursor to Dungeons & Dragons 
Chain Mail, novel by Diane Carey 2001
 Chain Mail (film), a 2015 Filipino mystery horror film
 "Chainmail", song by Curve from album Gift (Curve album)
 Chain Mail (song) by James

See also 
Chain letter (disambiguation)